The Men's 100-yard dash  at the 1930 British Empire Games as part of the athletics programme was held at the Civic Stadium.

The event was competed over 3 heats and a final.

Result

Heats
Qualification: First 2 in each heat (Q) qualify directly for the final.

Final

References

Athletics at the 1930 British Empire Games
1934